EchoStar XV is an American geostationary communications satellite which is operated by EchoStar. It is positioned in geostationary orbit, and will be located at a longitude of 61.5° West, from where it is intended to provide direct broadcasting of high-definition television services to the continental United States and Puerto Rico for Dish Network.

EchoStar XV was built by Space Systems/Loral, and is based on the LS-1300 satellite bus. It has a design life of fifteen years,; however, it is carrying enough fuel for around twenty years of operations. It has a common configuration with EchoStar XI and EchoStar XVI.

The launch of EchoStar XV was conducted by International Launch Services, using a Proton-M carrier rocket with a Briz-M upper stage. The launch occurred from Site 200/39 at the Baikonur Cosmodrome in Kazakhstan, at 18:40 UTC on 10 July 2010. The launch successfully placed EchoStar XV into a geosynchronous transfer orbit.

See also

2010 in spaceflight

References

Spacecraft launched in 2010
Communications satellites in geostationary orbit
Satellites using the SSL 1300 bus
Spacecraft launched by Proton rockets
E15